7 Days of Funk is the eponymous debut studio album by California-based funk duo 7 Days of Funk, consisting of rapper Snoop Dogg—performing under his funk persona Snoopzilla—and modern-funk musician Dâm-Funk. The album was released on December 10, 2013, by Stones Throw Records and is Snoop's first project with a single producer since his landmark 1993 debut album, Doggystyle. Recording sessions for the album took place in 2013 at The Compound and at Funkmosphere Lab in Los Angeles, and the mastering was performed at Bernie Grundman Mastering in Hollywood.

Guest appearances on the album include Tha Dogg Pound members Daz Dillinger and Kurupt, and former Slave frontman Steve Arrington. The album was supported by the single "Faden Away", followed by the promotional single "Hit Da Pavement". 7 Days of Funk was met with generally positive reviews from music critics with an average score of 74 at Metacritic, based on 19 reviews. It was named in HipHopDX's list of top 25 albums of 2013.

Background
Calvin "Snoopzilla" Broadus and Damon "Dâm-Funk" Riddick met in Los Angeles on February 16, 2011, at the opening of The Dogg House—an exhibition of Snoop-inspired artwork—when the latter performed at a gallery party thrown for Joe Cool, the illustrator behind the cover artwork to several Snoop records including his seminal 1993 debut album, Doggystyle. Impressed by Dâm's P-Funk-inspired beats, Snoop grabbed the microphone and freestyled for more than an hour. "It felt like magic," Snoop recalls. After the initial meeting, the two paired when the rapper invited the funk musician to play keyboard and keytar onstage for a performance at Funk n Soul Extravaganza at the SXSW Music Festival on March 19, 2011. They forged a mutual admiration; then unexpectedly, Snoop sent Dâm a cryptic SoundCloud message: "I need some of that heat." For Stones Throw Records founder Chris "Peanut Butter Wolf" Manak, "It made perfect sense for them to [collaborate]. They're approximately the same age, and they both [represent] Los Angeles funk the hardest."

In an October 2013 interview with Rolling Stone, Snoop commented on their collaboration, saying "We're the babies of the Mothership. I've had funk influences in my music my whole career. Dâm-Funk is cold. He's keeping the funk alive and I knew I had to get down with him." Dâm-Funk echoed Snoop's sentiments as he elaborated: "These beats were made for him and he laid down some of the smoothest harmonies and melodies I've ever heard. It's hip-hop, but you can also hear what we grew up on, from Zapp to Evelyn "Champagne" King and Patrice Rushen."

Snoop also spoke about re-branding himself as Snoopzilla for this project, which pays homage to Funkadelic maestro Bootsy Collins who sometimes uses the monikers Bootzilla as well as Zillatron, saying "When I'm recording as Snoopzilla, I'm basically an offspring of Bootsy [Collins].  We're keeping that spirit alive with that tone, that delivery, that R&B/funk singing, like Rick James and Steve Arrington.  And on this EP, I was on some relationship shit: being tired of the one that I'm with and trying to be with the one that I'm with—shit where I'm questioning the one that I love.  I'm not even talking about nobody personally.  Is it music?  Is it my wife?  I'm questioning something!  I don't even know what the fuck it is.  As time goes by, I get a clearer vision on why I'm saying what I said, because some of these songs are really affecting me right now emotionally.  They were just songs I did out of the spirit of having fun, but when I write shit, it comes to motherfucking life."

Recording and production

7 Days of Funk was recorded in Los Angeles in 2013 by Shon Lawon at The Compound, except "Hit Da Pavement" which was recorded by Dâm-Funk at Funkmosphere Lab. The album, mixed by Cole M.G.N. and Shon Lawon, with additional engineering by Frank Vasquez, was mastered at Bernie Grundman Mastering in Hollywood by Brian "Big Bass" Gardner. The album features guest appearances from Snoop's Tha Dogg Pound cohorts Daz Dillinger and Kurupt, as well as drummer-vocalist Steve Arrington. According to Dâm-Funk, other artists including rapper Tyler, The Creator wanted to be involved on the project, but time ran out. All songs are produced by Dâm-Funk and feature background vocals from Shan Lawon and Val Young.

The album opener, "Hit Da Pavement", which features additional vocals from Bootsy Collins, was the first track 7 Days of Funk recorded. In an interview for Pitchfork, Dâm-Funk expressed that "the energy was so explosive" with "Hit Da Pavement" and that he was impressed by Snoopzilla's work ethic. "[Snoop] came to the pad at 10 p.m. and we were done at midnight. He killed it. His work ethic is stupid, man. I've never seen anything like it. I was [in] New York, in A1 [Record Shop] just listening to some records, and Snoop calls, like, 'Hey man, you need to check this out, check your email.' Four hours later I'm at the club, and he's like, 'Hey man, check these out, two more done.' He was just smashing them. When you're inspired by something, that's how you do it."

Dâm-Funk created the music, and Snoopzilla came up with the vocals, then Dâm took it from there. "I was like, 'I'm letting Dam-Funk produce me, so produce me'," Snoop explained during an interview with Spin. "That's what the project was all about  –  him having the comfort zone of doing what he do, with no 'Hey man, we've got to get this done by this date.' No pressure, no dates, no nothing. We worked when we wanted to work and made what we wanted to make." Dâm-Funk gave Snoopzilla creative freedom on each song. "I just left it up to Snoop," he told HipHopDX. "I mean he was in charge of all of that. He really did a good job. And it was like a telepathic type of vibe, where I didn't have to say too much or anything at all. It's like he just handled it and knew where to put different nuances in and place the cadences. His rhythm matches everything I wanna hear on a track. So it worked out beautifully."

Snoopzilla explained that he and Dâm made the album only thirty-four minutes in length because it would induce the listener to want more. "We just be looking at it like it's only 34 minutes of music. That's all we gave up was 34 minutes. But it's 34 minutes of quality music, good music. Babygirl that [did an] interview with me, she was like, 'That music reminds me of a big hug. I could just play it from top to bottom.' There's a lot of albums you can't play from top to bottom anymore, you gotta go to your favorite song and go back and go forward. This record you could play from top to bottom. And it's 34 minutes, so by the time you get to where you going, it just started all over again, and you back riding again."

Title and artwork
According to Snoop, the album title, 7 Days of Funk, refers to the amount of time it took to create the project. "Seven songs. And seven days to find the funk," he said during an interview with Spin.  "You only get seven days in a week, but you found that funk, so you can continue. You can funk for another seven days. You can funk until the end of time. But those seven days are what's important. We just going one week at a time, and we trying to make sure we handle you on every day of that week. With the funk." Dâm explained to Life+Times that 7 Days of Funk is self-explanatory. "Just imagine living seven days of funk. That's what your life, what you're living and breathing. There's only seven days in a week, so what's after that? Another seven days of funk."

Directed by Stones Throw cover artist Jeff Jank, the album artwork is drawn by Lawrence "Raw Dawg" Hubbard, co-founder and artist behind Los Angeles cult magazine, Real Deal Comix. The vinyl LP edition features a wrap-around drawing showing the front and back of a theater. Snoopzilla and Dâm-Funk are hanging out in front of their low rider—a time machine, in fact—with some thuggish throw-down happening at the theater doors. On the back, there is paparazzi, drunks and prostitutes.

Promotion
On October 15, 2013, Stones Throw published on YouTube the behind-the-scenes of 7 Days of Funk's jam session at Funkmosphere Lab in which an early version of "Hit Da Pavement" and "Wingz" were previewed. On October 21, 2013, the Southern California duo performed "Faden Away" on Jimmy Kimmel Live!, along with another song from the album entitled "Do My Thang". For promotional purposes, 7 Days of Funk was made available to stream on December 1, 2013, via NPR Music until the album's release.  Stones Throw released "Hit Da Pavement" and "Faden Away" together on a cassingle on December 10, 2013, with both vocal and instrumental versions. The cassette was given away exclusively with the first week's orders of the LP and 45 box set. The 45 box set was released on February 5, 2014, with a total of eight records with sixteen tracks: each song on the album released on 7-inch single, backed with its instrumental version. The box includes the bonus record "Wingz"—not available on any other format—with A-side "Systematic". Purchase of the box set comes with a digital download of the original 8-track album and a 7 Days of Funk sticker.

On December 9, 2013, Rdio published on YouTube a 1980s VHS-quality promotional video created by Golden Wolf—an animation production company—featuring Dâm-Funk and Snoopzilla as Muppets-inspired marionettes performing their song "Do My Thang".  7 Days of Funk—including the exclusive bonus track "Wingz"—was streaming exclusively on Rdio on December 9 until December 24.  On December 9, 2013, the duo performed "Faden Away" on Conan, and The Queen Latifah Show on the following day. The album was officially released on LP, CD and digital download formats on December 10, 2013. On the same day, the music video for "Hit Da Pavement" premiered on 7 Days of Funk's VEVO.  By evening, Dâm-Funk and Snoopzilla celebrated the release of 7 Days of Funk at the Exchange Night Club in Los Angeles, performing live with Peanut Butter Wolf (host), Egyptian Lover, Bootsy Collins, Steve Arrington and special guests. On January 15, 2014, the music video was released for "I'll Be There 4U". On February 26, 2014, the music video was released for "Do My Thang".

Singles
The lead single, "Faden Away", premiered on October 8, 2013, on Stones Throw Records' SoundCloud page and was made available at the Stones Throw Store and iTunes Music Store on October 15, 2013. On November 5, 2013, the music video was released for the track. 7 Days of Funk named "Faden Away" as their favorite song on the album.

Critical reception

7 Days of Funk received generally positive reviews from music critics. At Metacritic, which assigns a normalized rating out of 100 to reviews from mainstream critics, the album received an average score of 74, based on 19 reviews. Matt Bauer of Exclaim! praised the album, and commented that "Apart from a generic cameo from Kurupt on 'Ride', 7 Days of Funk is an infectious, modern take on the funk genre – here's hoping that Snoopzilla and Dâm-Funk will collaborate again."  HipHopDX reviewer Jessica Rew praised 7 Days of Funk, believing the collection features Dâm-Funk's best production work to date and viewed it as "Snoop's most enjoyable album in years". Chisom Uzosike of XXL, who awarded the album an "XL" rating, shared a similar sentiment and expressed that "George Clinton would be proud of this fresh take on funk music." Phil Hebblethwaite of NME describes the album as "a groove and a mood piece; a funk report for the ages and the future – and, after less than 40 minutes (including the bonus tracks), it drops out of space at exactly the right moment." Ron Hart of Blurt Magazine expressed that despite the name of the project being 7 Days of Funk, "there's enough groove in this [record] to last a lifetime."

David Jeffries of AllMusic compared the album to Snoop Lion's reggae effort Reincarnated (2013), commenting that 7 Days of Funk "is pleasingly loose and small" unlike Reincarnated "which seemed to trip over its own overambition". In conclusion, he wrote that "Even if this is Snoop's first album with a single producer since the monolithic, Dr. Dre-helmed Doggystyle, don't call it a comeback, call it lark, and a funky, welcome one at that." Andy Beta of Spin felt that "7 Days acts as the inverse of The Chronic," elaborating that in the latter "a famous hip-hop producer introduced the world to an up-and-coming MC weaned on P-Funk and George Duke now, it's a pop-cultural hip-hop icon giving a bit of shine to an adept indie producer who can elicit all strains of funk in this 21st-century Zone of Zero Funkativity." Dave Heaton of PopMatters claimed that "A laidback funk groove is the essence of 7 Days of Funk, with Snoopzilla's vocals taking his relaxed approach to its full. […] To say Dâm-Funk is engineering a new kind of funk would be a misstatement; to say he has a keen sense for the atmosphere as well as the rhythms of funk, an understanding of what really makes for a classic funk track, would be an understatement." Pitchfork writer Nate Patrin wrote that "It's a strong mode to be in, but 7 Days of Funk doesn't change or challenge things—it's a brief LP, even accounting for bonus tracks, and with everybody firmly in a comfortable lane there's not much surprise."

In a mixed review, Rolling Stones Mike Powell felt that "While Snoop's voice is an easy match for the sound—both are low-key but hard-hitting—most of the tracks don't quite cohere." Brian Josephs of Consequence of Sound also provided a mixed review, calling 7 Days of Funk a "slog through shallow percussion (especially in the amateurish drum pattern on the Kurupt-featuring 'Ride') and drowsy synthwork". The reviewer described the duo's productivity as "the musical equivalent to two longtime friends spending a Saturday afternoon on the couch". Chase Woodruff, writer for Slant Magazine, wrote that "No amount of pitch correction and filtering can change the fact that Calvin Broadus, no matter what he calls himself, can't sing, and 7 Days of Funk is as lyrically empty an album as you'll hear this year; any message it may have is exclusively vibe-based. But it's a welcome sign of life from an MC who many assumed to be over the hill, and where it fails, it fails on its own terms—and that's a kind of success in itself."

Track listing

Notes
All tracks are produced by Dâm-Funk.
"Hit Da Pavement" features additional vocals from Bootsy Collins.

Personnel
Credits for 7 Days of Funk adapted from AllMusic and from the album liner notes.

 7 Days of Funk – primary artist
 Delmar "Daz Dillinger" Arnaud – composer
 Steve Arrington – composer, featured artist
 Kevin Barkey – management (Snoopzilla)
 Calvin "Snoopzilla" Broadus – composer, executive producer, vocals
 Ricardo "Kurupt" Brown – composer, featured artist
 Ted Chung – management (Snoopzilla)
 Cole M.G.N. – mixing
 Bootsy Collins – vocals [additional]
 Tha Dogg Pound – featured artist
 Brian "Big Bass" Gardner – mastering
 Wes Harden – management (Dâm-Funk)
 Lawrence Hubbard – cover illustration
 Jeff Jank – art direction
 Shon Lawon – engineer, mixing, vocals [background]
 Damon "Dâm-Funk" Riddick – engineer, instrumentation, producer
 Patrice Rushen – composer
 Brent Smith – booking
 Frank Vasquez – A&R, engineer
 Freddie Washington – composer
 Val Young – vocals [background]

Chart positions

Release history

References

2013 debut albums
Snoop Dogg albums
Stones Throw Records albums
Funk albums by American artists
G-funk albums
Dâm-Funk albums
Collaborative albums